Donald Edward Newhouse (born 1929) is an American billionaire heir and business magnate. He owns Advance Publications, founded by his father, Samuel Irving Newhouse Sr., in 1922, whose properties include Condé Nast (publisher of such magazines as Vogue, Vanity Fair, and The New Yorker), dozens of newspapers across the US (including The Star-Ledger, The Plain Dealer, and The Oregonian), cable company Bright House Networks and a controlling stake in Discovery Communications. According to Bloomberg Billionaires Index, he has an estimated net worth of $19.4 billion. He resides in New York City.

Early life
Newhouse's father, Samuel Irving Newhouse Sr., was born on the Lower East Side of Manhattan and began the family media business. His mother, Mitzi Epstein, was an arts patron and philanthropist who grew up in an upper middle class family on the Upper West Side, the daughter of a silk tie importer. Donald Newhouse is Jewish, and was listed on the Jerusalem Post's list of the world's 50 richest Jews in 2010.

Philanthropy 
In January 2020, Newhouse donated $75 million to  Syracuse University's S. I. Newhouse School of Public Communications. The communications school is named after his father, Samuel Irving Newhouse Sr.

It was announced in March 2021 that Newhouse and his wife Susan would launch a fund at the Association for Frontotemporal Degeneration (AFTD) with a $20m donation, the largest donation in the charity's history.

Personal life
Newhouse married Susan Marley in 1955, just after she had graduated from Wellesley College.

Katherine Irene Newhouse - school teacher at the Town School in New York; married Dr. Joseph Patrick Mele in 1991.
Michael Andrew Newhouse - assistant publisher of the Times of Trenton; member of Associated Press board of directors since 2017; married Elyse Sue Applebaum in 1988. Elyse's brother, Scott Applebaum, is founder and CEO of Multispark, LLC. Elyse works as the president of global development at Advance's magazine company Conde Nast International.
Steven O. Newhouse (b. 1957) - editor of the Jersey Journal; married in 1993 to Gina Sanders, later publisher of Gourmet and Teen Vogue.

The couple's primary residence was in New York City, but they often spent weekends on their farm in New Jersey. They remained married until her death in 2015 of primary progressive aphasia, the same rare disorder that afflicted his brother, Si Newhouse.

References

1929 births
Living people
American mass media owners
American newspaper publishers (people)
American billionaires
American people of Austrian-Jewish descent
American people of Belarusian-Jewish descent
Jewish American philanthropists
Donald
20th-century American businesspeople
Syracuse University trustees
S.I. Newhouse School of Public Communications alumni